Civic Square is the government district in downtown New Brunswick, the county seat of Middlesex County, New Jersey. Numerous county governmental buildings are located there along with other city and federal public buildings such as New Brunswick City Hall, the New Brunswick Main Post Office, and the New Brunswick Free Public Library. South of New Brunswick Station, it is bounded by the city's theater district, which includes the Mason Gross School of the Arts, the State Theatre, the Crossroads Theatre, George Street Playhouse and the Livingston Avenue Historic District which includes the  Henry Guest House and the Willow Grove Cemetery.

Middlesex County Courthouse
The last of a series of county courthouses, the Middlesex County Court House was built in 1958. The building was extensively renovated in 2003, including a partial new facade. The County Courthouse houses all Parts of the Law Division of the New Jersey Superior Court (Criminal, Civil, and Special Civil) for the Middesex Vicinage, as well as the General Equity Part of the Middlesex Vicinage Chancery Division.

Middlesex County Administration Building
It was extensively renovated in 2003 as residential mixed-used building; however, its lower floors continue to house court facilities, including the Records department for the Civil Part of the Law Division and the General Equity Part of the Chancery Division, as well as chambers for those judges of the Appellate Division who sit in New Brunswick. A new Administration Building was completed in 1999.

Middlesex County Family Courthouse
Opened in 2000, Middlesex County Family Courthouse houses the Family Part of the Chancery Division of the Superior Court, the New Brunswick Parking Authority, and the New Brunswick Center of Middlesex County College

Middlesex County Public Safety Building
Completed in May 2000, the Public Safety Building houses the U.S. Postal Service, the New Brunswick Police Department, the New Brunswick Municipal Courts, and the Middlesex County Prosecutor.

See also
List of tallest buildings in New Brunswick
National Register of Historic Places listings in Middlesex County, New Jersey
List of United States federal courthouses in New Jersey
Government Center, Newark

References

External links 
New Jersey Judiciary Middlesex
Middlesex County
Middlesex County Building 1906

County government buildings in New Jersey
Buildings and structures in New Brunswick, New Jersey
Neighborhoods in New Brunswick, New Jersey
Squares in New Jersey